Raymond Caron, O.M.R., (also known as Raymond Redmond) (1605 at Athlone, Ireland – 1666 at Dublin) was an Irish Recollect Franciscan friar and author.

Life

Entering the Franciscan friary in his native town, he there made his preliminary studies, after which he studied philosophy at Drogheda. Subsequently, he left Ireland and studied theology at Salzburg and at the Franciscan college at the Catholic University of Louvain. At the latter place he was, immediately after his ordination, appointed professor of theology, and in that capacity maintained the reputation he had earned as a student.

In 1653, Caron published at Antwerp a work Roma triumphans Septicollis, in defense of Catholic doctrine.

Caron was sent to Ireland in 1648 by Friar Pierre Marchant, who was a Definitor General of the Order, as a Visitor to the Franciscan Province of Ireland, with ample powers to correct and reform. This was done at the suggestion of James Butler, 1st Duke of Ormonde. He took up residence at the Franciscan friary at Kilkenny, and plunged at once into the strife of faction then raging there. Opposing both the papal nuncio, Giovanni Battista Rinuccini, and Owen Roe O'Neill, he sought to bring all to the side of the Duke of Ormonde, and imprisoned the members of his own Order at Kilkenny who refused to adopt his views.

This act made him so unpopular that his life was in danger, and he had to be protected by the Earl of Castlehaven at the head of an armed force. This conduct earned for him the character of a loyalist; but it brought on him the condemnation of Friar John Barnewall, OFM, the Minister Provincial of Ireland, together with the guardians of the various communities of friars on the island. For a time he was under ecclesiastical censure.

During the rule of the Puritans Caron remained abroad, but returned to England at the Restoration of 1660, and lived there for several years. He was throughout the supporter of the Duke of Ormonde and his policy. He wrote two works, in defense of Friar Peter Walsh's History of the Irish Remonstrance, namely: Loyalty asserted, and the late Remonstrance of the Irish Clergy and Laity confirmed and proved by the authority of Scripture, Fathers, etc. (London, 1662); and Remonstrantia Hibernorum contra Lovanienses (London, 1665).

He returned to Ireland where he died in Dublin in 1666.

Reference

External links
 http://www.libraryireland.com/biography/RedmondCaron.php

Attribution

1605 births
1666 deaths
Recollects
Irish writers
Franciscan scholars
17th-century Irish Roman Catholic priests
People from Athlone